Dipentylone (also known as Dimethylpentylone) is a substituted cathinone derivative with stimulant effects, which has been sold as a designer drug, first detected in Sweden in 2014.

N,N-DiMethylPentylone was first identified in toxicology samples in the USA in late 2021 and has been tracked by The Center for Forensic Science Research and Education (CFSRE) as an increasing common drug mismarketed as MDMA where Eutylone was previously commonly mismarketed as MDMA.

Dimethylpentylone is not specifically listed in the United States Controlled Substance Act but would likely be considered illegal as a positional isomer of N-Ethylpentylone which is a schedule 1 substance in the United States and defined as "all isomers" within that definition. 

Pentylone is a known metabolite of Dimethylpentylone.

See also 
 Dibutylone
 Diethylpropion
 Dimethylone
 Ephylone
 Isohexylone
 MDPV
 N-Ethylhexedrone
 N-Ethylhexylone
 Pentylone

References 

Cathinones
Designer drugs
Stimulants
Dimethylamino compounds